= Shingri =

Village in Maharashtra

- Village
- Country: India
- State: Maharashtra

Shingri is a small village in Ratnagiri district, Maharashtra state in Western India. The 2011 Census of India recorded a total of 350 residents in the village. Shingri's geographical area is approximately 330 hectares (820 acres).
